Legend of the Seeker is an American television series produced by ABC Studios and distributed in domestic syndication by Disney-ABC Domestic Television. The show is based on the fantasy novel series The Sword of Truth written by Terry Goodkind and follows a woods guide who, after being thrust into a world of magic, is charged with the responsibility to protect the world from evil. The first season premiered with a double bill on November 1, 2008. The series was renewed for a second season in January 2009, which premiered on November 7, 2009. On April 26, 2010 Ausiello Files reported that the series has been cancelled and will not return for a third season.  Fans of the series have responded by launching a renewal campaign titled "Save Our Seeker". Terry Goodkind has expressed his support for the campaign.

A total of 44 episodes aired throughout the series.

Series overview

Episodes

Season 1 (2008–09)
When Richard Cypher (Craig Horner), a young woodsman, discovers that he is the one true Seeker and is prophecised to kill the evil tyrant Darken Rahl (Craig Parker). Along with the beautiful and mysterious Kahlan Amnell (Bridget Regan), a Confessor with the power to enslave people with a single touch, and a wise old wizard named Zeddicus Zu'l "Zedd" Zorander (Bruce Spence), Richard embarks on quest to fulfill the prophecy.

Season 2 (2009–10)
The trio discovers that the defeat of Darken Rahl unknowingly caused a tear in the veil which separates the world of the living and the Underworld, and the only way to seal the tear is to seek out the legendary Stone of Tears. The team is also joined by the Mord-Sith Cara (Tabrett Bethell), who reluctantly teamed up with the Seeker and helped Richard kill Darken Rahl.

References

The Sword of Truth
Lists of action television series episodes
Lists of fantasy television series episodes

it:Episodi de La spada della verità (prima stagione)